Ocean City State Park is a state-operated, public recreation area on the Pacific Ocean in Grays Harbor County, Washington, about  north of downtown Ocean Shores. The park offers  of beach, dunes, and lodgepole pine and activities that include picnicking, camping, fishing, scuba diving, swimming, clam digging, crabbing, beachcombing, birdwatching, wildlife viewing, and interpretive programs.

References

External links 
Ocean City State Park Washington State Parks and Recreation Commission 
Ocean City State Park Map Washington State Parks and Recreation Commission

Parks in Grays Harbor County, Washington
State parks of Washington (state)